Sergei Vasilyevich Moiseyev (born 6 April 1959) is a former Russian professional footballer.

Club career
He made his professional debut in the Soviet Top League in 1980 for FC Dynamo Moscow. He played 1 game in the UEFA Cup 1980–81 for FC Dynamo Moscow.

References

1959 births
Footballers from Moscow
Living people
Soviet footballers
Russian footballers
Association football forwards
FC Dynamo Moscow players
Soviet Top League players
FC Znamya Truda Orekhovo-Zuyevo players
FC Dynamo Vologda players